Cuscuta babylonica is a species of parasitic plants in the morning glory family, Convolvulaceae. It is found in Iraq and Turkmenistan.

The plant shows supernumerary chromosomes which are holocentric during meiosis.

It is a parasite of Carthamus glaucus.

References

External links 

 Cuscuta babylonica at Tropicos

babylonica

Flora of Asia
Taxa named by Jacques Denys Choisy